Linas Balsys (born 1976 in Radviliškis) is a paralympic athlete from Lithuania competing mainly in category T12 long-distance running events.

Linas has competed in three Paralympics, winning a bronze medal.  He first competed in the 2000 Summer Paralympics in the T13 5000m and marathon without any medal success.  He returned four years later in 2004 where he competed in the 5000m, 10000m and won a bronze medal in the Marathon. He could not match this achievement in the 2008 Summer Paralympics failing to finish in the 10000m and only managing twelfth in the marathon.

References

1976 births
Paralympic athletes of Lithuania
Athletes (track and field) at the 2004 Summer Paralympics
Paralympic bronze medalists for Lithuania
Living people
People from Radviliškis
Medalists at the 2004 Summer Paralympics
Paralympic medalists in athletics (track and field)
Lithuanian male long-distance runners
Lithuanian male marathon runners